The Grand Duchy of Frankfurt was a German satellite state of Napoleonic creation.  It came into existence in 1810 through the combination of the former territories of the Archbishopric of Mainz along with the Free City of Frankfurt itself.

History

Frankfurt lost its status as a free imperial city in 1806 with the dissolution of the Holy Roman Empire. The city was granted to the former archbishop of Mainz, Karl Theodor Anton Maria von Dalberg, and became the Principality of Frankfurt. When Dalberg was forced by Napoleon to relinquish his Principality of Regensburg to the Kingdom of Bavaria in 1810, his remaining territories of Aschaffenburg, Wetzlar, Fulda, Hanau, and Frankfurt were combined into the new Grand Duchy of Frankfurt.

Although the grand duchy was named after Frankfurt, the city was administered by French commissioners while Dalberg resided in the city of Aschaffenburg.  According to the constitution of the grand duchy, upon Dalberg's death, the state would be inherited by Napoleon's stepson, Eugène de Beauharnais.

Dalberg abdicated in favour of Eugene on 26 October 1813, following Napoleon's defeat at the Battle of Leipzig. The grand duchy ceased to exist after December 1813, when the city was occupied by allied troops. While Frankfurt itself once again became a free city, most of the territory of the grand duchy was ultimately annexed by the Kingdom of Bavaria.

States of the Confederation of the Rhine
Former states and territories of Bavaria
Frankfurt
Grand Duchy
Former grand duchies
1810 establishments in Europe
1813 disestablishments in Europe